David Lee Pethtel (born January 28, 1951 in Wheeling, West Virginia) is an American politician who served as a member of the West Virginia House of Delegates representing District 5 from 1998 to 2022. Pethtel served non-consecutively from January 1989 until January 1995.

Education
Pethtel earned his AB from Glenville State College and his MA from West Virginia University.

Elections
2012 Pethtel was unopposed for the May 8, 2012 Democratic Primary, winning with 2,856 votes, and returning 2002 and 2008 opponent Denzil Sloan ran as the Constitution Party candidate, setting up a rematch; Pethtel won the three-way November 6, 2012 General election with 4,596 votes (80.7%) against Mountain Party candidate Raymond Davis and Sloan.
1980s and early 1990s Pethtel was initially elected in the 1988 Democratic Primary and the November 8, 1988 General election and was re-elected in the general elections of November 6, 1990 and November 3, 1992.
1998 When the District 5 seat was left open, Pethtel won the 1998 Democratic Primary and won the November 3, 1998 General election against Republican nominee Ed Amos.
2000 Pethtel was unopposed for the 2000 Democratic Primary and won the November 7, 2000 General election against Republican nominee Charles Clements.
2002 Pethtel was unopposed for the 2002 Democratic Primary and won the November 5, 2002 General election against Constitution Party candidate Denzil Sloan.
2004 Pethtel and returning 1998 Republican opponent Ed Amos both won their 2004 primaries, setting up a rematch; Pethtel won the November 2, 2004 General election against Amos.
2006 Pethtel was unopposed for both the 2006 Democratic Primary and the November 7, 2006 General election.
2008 Pethtel was unopposed for the May 13, 2008 Democratic Primary, winning with 3,672 votes, returning 2002 challenger Denzil Sloan ran as the Constitution candidate, setting up a rematch; Pethtel won the November 4, 2008 General election with 5,025 votes (84.5%) against Sloan.
2010 Pethtel was challenged in the May 11, 2010 Democratic Primary, winning with 2,029 votes (70.1%), and was unopposed for the November 2, 2010 General election, winning with 3,835 votes.

References

External links
Official page at the West Virginia Legislature

David Pethtel at Ballotpedia
Dave Pethtel at the National Institute on Money in State Politics

1951 births
Living people
Glenville State College alumni
Democratic Party members of the West Virginia House of Delegates
People from Hundred, West Virginia
Politicians from Wheeling, West Virginia
West Virginia University alumni
21st-century American politicians